Jack Angel (October 24, 1930 – October 18, 2021) was an American voice actor and radio personality. He provided voice-overs for animation and video games. Angel had voiced characters in shows by Hasbro and Hanna-Barbera such as Super Friends, The Transformers and G.I. Joe and was involved in numerous productions by Disney and Pixar. Before becoming involved with voiceover work, Angel was initially a disc jockey for radio stations, namely KMPC and KFI. The day of his death, October 18, a piece of lost 1980s paraphernalia that contained his voice as the lead role, being the U.S. dub of TUGS, was discovered.

Biography
Angel was born on October 24, 1930 in Modesto, California, the second child of John Angel, a Greek immigrant, and Lucille (née Parsons). He graduated from San Francisco State University in 1957, and at the same time, he was hired as a disc jockey for a California radio station and decided to focus on a career in radio programs. A decade later, he had become one of the most popular radio personalities with his radio programs being heard on stations KMPC and KFI, Los Angeles. In the early years of his career, he also landed roles in stage productions at The Actor's Ring and the Portland Civic Theater. It was during his broadcasting career that he began experimenting with voiceovers he would produce for clients; while at KMPC, Angel's demo ended up in the hands of Gary Owens, who already had made his own inroads as an animation voiceover actor and forwarded Angel's demo tape to his agent. After almost 20 years in radio, Angel shifted to voice acting on a full-time basis.
 
Angel's first jobs in the voice-over industry came in the mid-1970s, voice acting on the series Super Friends, in which he played Hawkman, The Flash and Samurai, including The All-New Super Friends Hour, Challenge of the Super Friends, Super Friends, The Legendary Super Powers Show and Super Powers Team: Galactic Guardians. During that time, he made guest appearances in Scooby-Doo and Scrappy-Doo and The Smurfs.

In the second season of the Transformers series (1985), Angel was the voice of Astrotrain, Smokescreen, Ramjet, and Omega Supreme, and he reprised the roles of Ramjet and Astrotrain in The Transformers: The Movie (1986). In the third and fourth seasons of The Transformers (1986-1987), Angel voiced Ultra Magnus (who had been played by Robert Stack in The Transformers: The Movie) and in the fourth season he voiced Cyclonus following the death of Roger C. Carmel.

He also lent his voice to the character Dr. Zachary Darret in the 1984 CBS animated series Pole Position, and also voiced Wet Suit on Sunbow's G.I. Joe and several characters on Dino-Riders.

In 1995, he was the voice of Nikki in the animated film Balto. He played the SWATbots on Sonic the Hedgehog, The Liquidator on Darkwing Duck, and Nick Fury on Spider-Man: The Animated series.

In 2001, Angel was the voice of "Teddy" in the movie A.I. Artificial Intelligence. He provided voices for animated films such as A Bug's Life, Monsters, Inc., Ice Age: The Meltdown, Cars, Horton Hears a Who, The Prince of Egypt, The Iron Giant, and Aladdin.

Angel has also ventured into video games, narrating the cult hit Killer7 as well as playing Wonkers the Watilla in Dreamfall: The Longest Journey, The Mayor in Ratchet & Clank, and Ammand the Corsair in the video game version of Pirates of the Caribbean: At World's End.

In 2002, shortly after the death of Gene Moss, Jack Angel voiced Smokey the Bear in a few public service announcements and radio spots until 2012. In 2007, he voiced an alien called Technorg on Ben 10. He also voiced Papa Smurf in the 2011 special, The Smurfs: A Christmas Carol and the 2013 special, The Smurfs: The Legend of Smurfy Hollow.

Nickelodeon
Angel did some voice work in Animated shows for Nickelodeon in the 2000s.
His roles include: 
Superintendent Chaplin in Hey Arnold!.
MacTavish in the second part of the episode "Sir Nigel" in The Wild Thornberrys
The Pirate Captain on the episode of Avatar: The Last Airbender titled "The Waterbending Scroll".
The Weathered One on an episode of My Life as a Teenage Robot titled "Weapons of Mass Distraction".
Comrade Chaos on El Tigre: The Adventures of Manny Rivera in the episode "Old Money".

He provided "additional voices" in Toy Story and Toy Story 2, and the voice of Chunk in Toy Story 3.

He also provided additional voices for Scooby-Doo and Scrappy-Doo, The Dukes, Snorks, Dino-Riders, The Smurfs, The Rescuers Down Under, The Little Mermaid, DuckTales the Movie: Treasure of the Lost Lamp, Land of Enchantment, Super Dave: Daredevil for Hire, Aladdin, Hercules, Quest for Camelot, Tarzan, The Iron Giant, Monsters, Inc., The Lorax, Monsters University and Despicable Me 2.

His uncredited voice roles include Rock in the 2014 American biblical epic film Noah and an Egyptian in the 1998 animated film The Prince of Egypt.

Personal life
Angel was married twice. He and his first wife, Barbara Angel, divorced in 1980. Together they had three children. He married talent agent/owner Arlene Thornton in 1984. They lived in Studio City and Malibu, California.

Death
Angel died on October 18, 2021, at the age of 90, shortly before his 91st birthday.

Filmography

Animated films

Animated series

 
 Mork & Mindy: The Animated Series — Additional voices
 The Dukes — Additional voices
 Snorks — Additional voices
 Saber Rider and the Star Sheriffs — Additional voices (English dub) 
 Denver, the Last Dinosaur — Prof. Chin
 Dino-Riders — Additional voices
 Kid 'n Play – Additional voices
 The Wizard of Oz – Additional voices
 Space Cats — Additional voices
 Where's Waldo? – Additional voices
 ProStars – Additional voices
 The Legend of Prince Valiant — Additional voices
 Super Dave: Daredevil for Hire - Additional voices
 The New Adventures of Captain Planet — Additional voices 
 The Fantastic Voyages of Sinbad the Sailor — Additional voices
 All-New Dennis the Menace — Additional voices 
 Sonic Underground — Gondar

Video games

Live action films — Voice
 Deal of the Century — Announcer
 Funny Lady — Radio Announcer
 The World's Greatest Lover — Voice on Record
 Trenchcoat — Head Kidnapper
 Joey (film) — Fletcher the Dummy
 Beetlejuice — Voice of The Preacher
 Hook — Pirates (ADR)
 Mom and Dad Save the World — Creature Voice (uncredited)
 Ticks — (ADR)
 The Fifth Element — Alien Commander
 Vendetta — Old Gaspare (ADR)
 A.I. Artificial Intelligence — Teddy
 Looney Tunes: Back in Action — The Crusher
 This is the End — Looping Voice Talent (uncredited)
 Noah — Rock (ADR) (uncredited)

Live action
 The Young and the Restless — Judge Martin J. Kline
 King B: A Life in Movies — Jack Cole
 Deterrence — Secretary of Defence
 Crime and Punishment in Suburbia — Russ
 Scrubs — PA System Announcer
 Crime Story — Series Narrator

Other
 The Legend of Paul Bunyan (short) — Narrator
 The Six Million Dollar Man — Voice of Tower Operator
 Metric Meets the Inchworm (short)
 CBS Library — Mister Spitznagle ("The Incredible Book Escape")
 The Tonight Show with Johnny Carson — Promo Announcer
 Silver Spoons — Chess Player
 Amazing Stories — Dog School Security Guard ("The Family Dog")
 Harry and the Hendersons — TV Wrestler
 I Am My Resume (short) — Stan Angeles
 Crime Story — Narrator
 Scrubs — PA System Announcer ("My Waste of Time")
 Brad and Gary (short) — Gary
 The Don of the Flies (short) — Narrator, Stooley, Harry and Moon (He also produced the short)
 The Smurfs: A Christmas Carol — Papa Smurf
 The Smurfs: The Legend of Smurfy Hollow — Papa Smurf
 Recruited (short) — Principal
 TUGS — Captain Star and Big Mac, only in test US dub

Commercials
 United States Forest Service — Smokey the Bear (2002—2012)

References

External links
 Official site
 
 Voice Chasers — Jack Angel 

1930 births
2021 deaths
20th-century American male actors
21st-century American male actors
American male voice actors
American male radio actors
American radio personalities
American male stage actors
American male video game actors
Male actors from California
American people of Greek descent
San Francisco State University alumni
Male actors from Modesto, California